Christophe Maurice Jean Kempé (born 2 May 1975 in Aubervilliers) handball player. He won a gold medal as a member of France's national team at the 2008 Summer Olympics.

References

External links 
 
 
 

1975 births
Living people
French male handball players
Olympic handball players of France
Olympic gold medalists for France
Olympic medalists in handball
Handball players at the 2008 Summer Olympics
Medalists at the 2008 Summer Olympics